Golden Star Ferries is a Greek ferry company operating from the Greek mainland to the Cyclades islands in the Aegean Sea.
Golden Star Ferries was founded in 2011 by Andriot brothers Giorgos and Dimitris Stephanou, who also own the Bright Navigation shipping freight company.

Current Fleet
Golden Star Ferries currently operates a fleet of two ships, one of which is a high-speed craft.

Future Fleet

Former fleet
 Superferry II (2011–2021)
 Superrunner (2017–2021)
 Superspeed (2018–2021)
 Supercat (2018-2021)

The Legend of Rafina
The legend og rafina or known to the public as Superferry II was one of the most important Greek ferries that currently sailed in route of Rafina-Andros-Tinos-Mykonos. The superferry II was created for Regie Moor Maritiem Transport (R.M.T.) and sailed for many different companies until STRINTZIS LINES bought it in order to renew their fleet with new and efficient sihps. In 1999 the ship moves to the hands of the newly created BLUE FERRIES(or BLUE STAR FERRIES as we know it today) which was created by the STRINTZIS LINES as their subsidiary company. In March 2011 the ferry is sold to a new company called GOLDEN STAR FERRIES one of the greatest ship companies in Greece. For 10 straight years the ship sailed in the same route . Unfortunately in its 28th year of service the company decided stop using the ship and sell it to the SEAJETS company. Now the ship on its 29th year of service still remains on the port of Rafina.

Routes

 Piraeus-Cyclades- Crete :
Piraeus-Andros-Tinos-Mykonos-Paros-Ios-Santorini-Heraklion (Superferry)

 Piraeus - Cyclades - Rafina:

Piraeus-Paros-Naxos-Mykonos-Tinos-Andros-Rafina (Superexpress)

References

Ferry companies of Greece
Companies based in the South Aegean
Transport companies established in 2011